John Beckram was an English professional footballer who played as a forward.

Career
Born in Sunderland, Beckram played for Sheffield United and Bradford City. For Bradford City, he made 25 appearances in the Football League; he also made 1 FA Cup appearance.

Sources

References

Year of birth missing
Year of death missing
English footballers
Sheffield United F.C. players
Bradford City A.F.C. players
English Football League players
Association football forwards